Stanton is a small hamlet and former civil parish, now in the parish of Netherwitton, in Northumberland, England, which is located  north west of Morpeth, and  north of Newcastle upon Tyne. In 1951 the parish had a population of 70.

The hamlet lies near to the River Font which joins the River Wansbeck near Mitford.

Governance 
Stanton is in the parliamentary constituency of Berwick-upon-Tweed. Stanton was formerly a township in Long Horsley parish, from 1866 Stanton was a civil parish in its own right until it was abolished on 1 April 1955 and merged with Netherwitton.

References

External links

Hamlets in Northumberland
Former civil parishes in Northumberland